Gray's Papaya is a hot dog restaurant chain, with its flagship restaurant located at 2090 Broadway at 72nd Street. In June 2020, it had one location operational during the COVID-19 pandemic. Several other locations had closed prior. Gray's Papaya is famous for its inexpensive (once sold for 50 cents, now, as of 2021, sell for $2.95), high-quality hot dogs, considered among the best in New York City. The "papaya" in the name refers to the papaya fruit drink sold at the establishment. They also sell orange, grape, piña colada, coconut champagne (non-alcoholic), and banana daiquiri (non-alcoholic) fruit drinks.

History

The chain was founded by a former partner of Papaya King, Nicholas Gray, in 1973, with its flagship restaurant located at 2090 Broadway at 72nd Street.

In the June 1, 2006, issue of Time Out New York, Gray's Papaya's hot dog was ranked first over its competitors Papaya King and Papaya Dog. On March 3, 2008, The New York Times reported that Gray's Papaya had endorsed Democratic candidate Barack Obama in his campaign for the 2008 U.S. Presidential Election. 

The former Hell’s Kitchen location of Gray's Papaya (at Eighth Avenue and 37th Street) closed in 2011 and the Greenwich Village branch (on Sixth Avenue at 8th Street) in 2014 due to rent increases. For several years after, the flagship location at 72nd street was the only location left. 

In 2016, Gray's Papaya signed a 20-year lease for a new midtown location on Eighth Avenue, between West 39th and West 40th streets. The location opened in spring 2017 but subsequently closed in 2020 due to the economic effects of the COVID-19 pandemic in New York City. After likewise shuttering their flagship location for the "first time in 47 years" on March 30, Gray's Papaya reopened the location in May 2020, with a new version of its "recession special" that featured two franks and a tropical drink for $6.95 including tax, with frontline healthcare workers eating the special for free. Thrillist listed it as one of the best hot dog locations in New York.

Menu

Gray's Papaya is famous for its inexpensive (once sold for 50 cents, now, as of 2021, sell for $2.95), high-quality hot dogs. The "papaya" in the name refers to the papaya fruit drink sold at the establishment. They also sell orange, grape, piña colada, coconut champagne (non-alcoholic), and banana daiquiri (non-alcoholic) fruit drinks.

The franchise has natural skinned franks. Gray's Papaya hot dogs are considered among the best in New York City.

Gray's Payaya's hot dogs and drinks are now available shipping nationwide.

Media

 In the 1995 film Die Hard with a Vengeance, a scene takes place across the street at 72nd and Broadway, with the sign shown prominently.

 In the 1997 film Fools Rush In, one of the characters has Gray's Papaya hot dogs delivered to her husband in Las Vegas.

 The 2001 film Down to Earth starring Chris Rock also features the restaurant.

 It is also featured in the 2008 movie Nick and Norah’s Infinite Playlist.

 In the 2010 film The Back-Up Plan, Jennifer Lopez orders a hot dog for take out dinner.

References

External links

 

1973 establishments in New York City
Hot dog restaurants in the United States
Restaurants established in 1973
Restaurants in Manhattan
Upper West Side